Cosmopterix panayella is a moth in the family Cosmopterigidae. It is found on the island of Panay in the Philippines.

References

Natural History Museum Lepidoptera generic names catalog

panayella